The Japan Open  is a darts tournament that has been held annually since 1976.

List of tournaments

Men's

Women's

See also
List of BDO ranked tournaments
List of WDF tournaments

References

External links
Japan Open at dartsdatabase.co.uk

1976 establishments in Japan
Darts tournaments